Lavina Fielding Anderson (born 13 April 1944 in Shelley, Idaho) is a Latter-day Saint scholar, writer, editor, and feminist. Anderson holds a Ph.D. in English from the University of Washington. Her editing credits include Sisters in Spirit: Mormon Women in Historical and Cultural Perspective (1987) and Tending the Garden: Essays on Mormon Literature (1996), as well as the Ensign, Dialogue: A Journal of Mormon Thought, Journal of Mormon History, Mormon Women's Forum Quarterly, and Case Reports of the Mormon Alliance. In 2001, Anderson published a critical edition of Lucy Mack Smith's memoir:Lucy's Book: A Critical Edition of Lucy Mack Smith's Family Memoir (Salt Lake City: Signature Books, 2001). In 1995, Anderson co-edited with Eugene England "Tending the Garden: Essays on Mormon Literature" (Salt Lake City:Signature Books, 1995).This first book-length collection of 15 essays on Mormon literature discusses such classic narratives as Joseph Smith's first vision and Parley P. Pratt's Autobiography, more recent experiments such as Levi Peterson's The Backslider and Terry Tempest Williams's Refuge, and addresses the question of what constitutes Mormon aesthetics. In May of 2020, her collection of essays "Mercy Without End:Toward a More Inclusive Church" Signature Books, 2020) was published, highlighting her concerns and reflections on issues of inclusiveness in The Church of Jesus Christ of Latter-day Saints.  

Anderson is one of the original trustees of the Mormon Alliance, founded in 1992 to document allegations of spiritual and ecclesiastical abuse in The Church of Jesus Christ of Latter-day Saints (LDS Church). In 1993, Anderson published a chronology documenting cases of what she regarded as spiritual abuse by LDS Church leaders during the 1970s, 1980s, and early 1990s. This article became grounds for her excommunication on charges of apostasy in September 1993, as one of the September Six. Anderson remains as active in the LDS Church as her excommunicant status allows; in 1996, she was described by Levi S. Peterson as exemplary of an emerging "church in exile" composed of faithful excommunicants. In 2019, her local stake leaders reconvened her court, and recommended her rebaptism to the First Presidency; this was rejected without a reason, nor conditions for reinstatement. In 2020, Signature Books published an anthology of 18 of her essays reflecting on her 25 years attending church as an excommunicant.

She was married to  Paul L. Anderson from 1977 until his death in 2018.

Selected works

See also
 Mormon feminism

References

External links
The Mormon Alliance June 2014 (from April 2010 scrape by Archive.org)
Lucy's Book edited by Lavina Fielding Anderson

1944 births
Living people
People excommunicated by the Church of Jesus Christ of Latter-day Saints
Editors of Latter Day Saint publications
Historians of the Latter Day Saint movement
People from Shelley, Idaho
Historians from Idaho
Mormon studies scholars
Latter Day Saints from Idaho
American Latter Day Saint writers
University of Washington College of Arts and Sciences alumni
American women historians
Critics of Mormonism
21st-century American historians
Mormon feminists
21st-century American women